A rooftop solar power system, or rooftop PV system, is a photovoltaic (PV) system that has its electricity-generating solar panels mounted on the rooftop of a residential or commercial building or structure. The various components of such a system include photovoltaic modules, mounting systems, cables, solar inverters and other electrical accessories.

Rooftop mounted systems are small compared to utility-scale solar ground-mounted photovoltaic power stations with capacities in the megawatt range, hence being a form of distributed generation. Most rooftop PV stations are Grid-connected photovoltaic power systems. Rooftop PV systems on residential buildings typically feature a capacity of about 5–20 kilowatts (kW), while those mounted on commercial buildings often reach 100 kilowatts to 1 Megawatt (MW). Very large roofs can house industrial scale PV systems in the range of 1–10 Megawatts.

Installation 

The urban environment provides a large amount of empty rooftop spaces and can inherently avoid the potential land use and environmental concerns. Estimating rooftop solar insolation is a multi-faceted process, as insolation values in rooftops are impacted by the following:
 Time of the year
 Latitude
 Weather conditions
 Roof slope
 Roof aspect
 Shading from adjacent buildings and vegetation

There are various methods for calculating potential solar PV roof systems including the use of Lidar and orthophotos. Sophisticated models can even determine shading losses over large areas for PV deployment at the municipal level.

Components of a rooftop solar array:

The following section contains the most commonly utilized components of a rooftop solar array. Though designs may vary with roof type (e.g. metal vs shingle), roof angle, and shading concerns, most arrays consist of some variation of the following components
 Solar Panels produce carbon free electricity when irradiated with sunlight. Often made of Silicon, solar panels are made of smaller solar cells which typically number 6 cells per panel. Multiple solar panels strung together make up a solar array. Solar panels are generally protected by tempered glass and secured with an aluminum frame. The front of a solar panel is very durable whereas the back of a panel is generally more vulnerable.
 Mounting clamps generally consist of aluminum brackets and stainless steel bolts that secure solar panels to one another on the roof and onto the rails. Clamps often vary in design in order to account for various roof and rail configurations.
 Racking or rails are made of metal and often lie in a parallel configuration on the roof for the panels to lie on. It is important that the rails are level enough for the panels to be evenly mounted.
 Mounts attach the rails and the entire array to the surface of the roof. These mounts are often L brackets that are bolted through flashing and into the rafters of the roof. Mounts vary in design due to the wide range of roof configurations and materials.
 Flashings are a durable metal plate that provide a water resistant seal between the mounts and roof surface. Oftentimes, caulk is used to seal the flashing to the roof and it resembles a metal roof shingle.
 DC/AC wiring for inverters connect wires between panels and into a micro inverter or string inverter. No cables should touch the roof surface or hang from the array to avoid weathering and the deterioration of cables.
 Micro inverters are mounted to the bottom of the panel and convert DC power from the panels into AC power that can be sent into the grid. Micro inverters allow for the optimization of each panel when shading occurs and can provide specific data from individual panels.

Thin film solar on metal roofs

With the increasing efficiencies of thin film solar, installing them on metal roofs has become cost competitive with traditional Monocrystalline and Polycrystalline solar cells.  The thin film panels are flexible and run down the standing seam metal roofs and stick to the metal roof with Adhesive, so no holes are needed to install. The connection wires run under the ridge cap at the top of the roof. Efficiency ranges from 10-18% but only costs about $2.00-$3.00 per watt of installed capacity, compared to Monocrystalline which is 	17-22% efficient and costs $3.00-$3.50 per watt of installed capacity.  Thin film solar is light weight at 7-10 ounces per square foot.  Thin film solar panels last 10-20 years but have a quicker ROI than traditional solar panels, the metal roofs last 40-70 years before replacement compared to 12-20 years for an asphalt shingle roof.

Finances

Installation cost

PV system prices (2022)

Incentives in the USA 
If you’re considering installing solar panels on your home or business, you may be eligible for various incentives and rebates offered by the government. Solar incentives by state in the USA can help offset the initial cost of installation and make solar power more affordable. In the United States, each state has its own set of incentives and rebates for solar energy.

 Federal Tax Credit: One of the most significant incentives for solar energy is the federal tax credit. The Investment Tax Credit (ITC) allows you to deduct 26% of the cost of installing a solar energy system from your federal taxes. This credit is available for both residential and commercial systems and is set to decrease to 22% in 2023.
 State Rebates: Many states offer rebates for solar energy systems. These rebates can vary widely from state to state and can be based on the size of the system, the type of technology used, and the location of the property. Some states also offer rebates for specific types of solar energy, such as solar water heating or solar pool heating.
 Net Metering: Net metering allows homeowners and businesses to sell excess solar energy back to the grid. The credits earned can be used to offset energy costs during non-solar hours. Net metering policies vary widely by state, with some states offering more favorable terms than others.
 Property Tax Exemptions: Some states offer property tax exemptions for solar energy systems. This means that the value of the solar panels and equipment will not be included in the property’s value for tax purposes.
 Sales Tax Exemptions: Some states offer sales tax exemptions for solar energy systems. This means that no sales tax will be charged on the purchase of solar panels, equipment, and installation.
 Performance-Based Incentives: Some states offer performance-based incentives, which pay homeowners and businesses based on the amount of solar energy t

Cost trends
In the mid-2000s, solar companies used various financing plans for customers such as leases and power purchase agreements. Customers could pay for their solar panels over a span of years, and get help with payments from credits from net metering programs. As of May 2017, installation of a rooftop solar system costs an average of $20,000. In the past, it had been more expensive.

Utility Dive wrote, "For most people, adding a solar system on top of other bills and priorities is a luxury" and "rooftop solar companies by and large cater to the wealthier portions of the American population." Most households that get solar arrays are "upper middle-income". The average household salary for solar customers is around $100,000. However, "a surprising number of low-income" customers appeared in a study of income and solar system purchases. "Based on the findings of the study, GTM researchers estimate that the four solar markets include more than 100,000 installations at low-income properties."

A report released in June 2018 by the Consumer Energy Alliance that analyzed U.S. solar incentives showed that a combination of federal, state and local incentives, along with the declining net cost of installing PV systems, has caused a greater usage of rooftop solar across the nation. According to Daily Energy Insider, "In 2016, residential solar PV capacity grew 20 percent over the prior year, the report said. The average installed cost of residential solar, meanwhile, dropped 21 percent to $2.84 per watt-dc in the first quarter of 2017 versus first quarter 2015." In fact, in eight states the group studied, the total government incentives for installing a rooftop solar PV system actually exceeded the cost of doing so. 

In 2019, the national average cost in the United States, after tax credits, for a 6 kW residential system was $2.99/W, with a typical range of $2.58 to $3.38.

Due to economies of scale, industrial-sized ground-mounted solar systems produce power at half the cost (2c/kWh) of small roof-mounted systems (4c/kWh).

Net-metering mechanism 

This is an arrangement for grid connected solar power systems. In this mechanism, the excess solar power generated is exported to the electricity grid. The consumer gets credit for the amount of power exported. At the end of the billing cycle, the consumer is charged for the net or difference of power imported and power exported to the electricity grid. Hence the name, net-metering.

A key point to note here is that there is no sale of solar power in this mechanism. The exported kWh are only used to adjust the imported kWh prior to the bill calculation.

Feed-in tariff mechanism 
In a grid connected rooftop photovoltaic power station, the generated electricity can sometimes be sold to the servicing electric utility for use elsewhere in the grid.  This arrangement provides payback for the investment of the installer. Many consumers from across the world are switching to this mechanism owing to the revenue yielded.  A public utility commission usually sets the rate that the utility pays for this electricity, which could be at the retail rate or the lower wholesale rate, greatly affecting solar power payback and installation demand.

The FIT as it is commonly known has led to an expansion in the solar PV industry worldwide. Thousands of jobs have been created through this form of subsidy. However it can produce a bubble effect which can burst when the FIT is removed. It has also increased the ability for localised production and embedded generation reducing transmission losses through power lines.

Hybrid systems 

A rooftop photovoltaic power station (either on-grid or off-grid) can be used in conjunction with other power components like diesel generators, wind turbines, batteries etc. These solar hybrid power systems may be capable of providing a continuous source of power.

Advantages 

Installers have the right to feed solar electricity into the public grid and hence receive a reasonable premium tariff per generated kWh reflecting the benefits of solar electricity to compensate for the current extra costs of PV electricity.

Disadvantages 

An electrical power system containing a 10% contribution from PV stations would require a 2.5% increase in load-frequency control (LFC) capacity over a conventional system—an issue which may be countered by using synchronverters in the DC/AC-circuit of the PV system. The break-even cost for PV power generation was in 1996 found to be relatively high for contribution levels of less than 10%. While higher proportions of PV power generation give lower break-even costs, economic and LFC considerations impose an upper limit of about 10% on PV contributions to the overall power systems.

Technical Challenges 

There are many technical challenges to integrating large amounts of rooftop PV systems to the power grid.

Reverse power flow 
 The electric power grid was not designed for two way power flow at the distribution level. Distribution feeders are usually designed as a radial system for one way power flow transmitted over long distances from large centralized generators to customer loads at the end of the distribution feeder. With localized and distributed solar PV generation on rooftops, reverse flow causes power to flow to the substation and transformer, causing significant challenges. This has adverse effects on protection coordination and voltage regulators.

Ramp rates
Rapid fluctuations of generation from PV systems due to intermittent clouds cause undesirable levels of voltage variability in the distribution feeder. At high penetration of rooftop PV, this voltage variability reduces the stability of the grid due to transient imbalance in load and generation and causes voltage and frequency to exceed set limits if not countered by power controls. That is, the centralized generators cannot ramp fast enough to match the variability of the PV systems causing frequency mismatch in the nearby system. This could lead to blackouts. This is an example of how a simple localized rooftop PV system can affect the larger power grid. The issue is partially mitigated by distributing solar panels over a wide area, and by adding storage.

Operation and maintenance
Rooftop PV solar operation and maintenance is of higher costs in comparison with ground-based facilities due to the distributed nature of rooftop facilities and harder access. In rooftop solar systems it typically takes a longer time to identify a malfunction and send a technician, due to lower availability of sufficient photovoltaic system performance monitoring tools and higher costs of human labor. As a result, rooftop solar PV systems typically suffer from lower quality of operation & maintenance and essentially lower levels of system availability and energy output.

Largest rooftop solar installations

See also 

 Building-integrated photovoltaics
 List of rooftop photovoltaic installations
 Maximum power point tracker
 Photovoltaic power station
 Solar cable
 Solar inverter
 Solar shingles
 Solar tracker

References 

Solar Rooftop system in India http://solarizeindia.in/product-category/grid-tie-solar-solution/

PhotovoltaicsAll You need to know about solar rooftop system http://solarizeindia.in/2021/06/08/all-you-need-to-know-about-solar-rooftop-system/